Gilbey is a surname. Notable people with the surname include:

Alex Gilbey (born 1994), English footballer
Alfred Newman Gilbey (1901–1998), British Roman Catholic priest and monsignor
Walter Gilbey (1831–1914), British wine-merchant and philanthropist

See also
Gilbey baronets